Wilhelm Ripe (16 November 1818 – 5 December 1885) was a German painter and graphic designer.

Ripe was born in Hahnenklee in 1818. His contributions were during the era of Romanticism.

He died in Goslar in 1885.

References 
 Griep, H.G.; Hahnemann, H., and Ullirch, H. (1980). Wilhelm Ripe 1818–1885. Ausstellung. Goslar: Goslar Museumsver.

19th-century German painters
19th-century German male artists
German male painters
German graphic designers
1818 births
1885 deaths
People from Goslar